is an anime series that runs in 5 minute segments. As of February 2009, 76 of Nanami-chans episodes have been broadcast on NHK since 2004.

Characters

External links

Official NHK Nanami-chan website 

2004 anime television series debuts
Comedy anime and manga
Fantasy anime and manga
Group TAC
Animated television series about dogs
NHK original programming